David I. Salo is a linguist who worked on the languages of J. R. R. Tolkien for the Lord of the Rings film trilogy, expanding the Elvish languages (particularly Sindarin) by building on vocabulary already known from published works, and defining some languages that previously had a very small published vocabulary. In 2003, when still a graduate student in linguistics at the University of Wisconsin–Madison, he provided the Elvish language translations for Peter Jackson's film trilogy. In 2004 he published the well-reviewed book A Gateway to Sindarin.

Salo on Tolkien's languages

Enthusiast 

Salo's interest in Tolkien's languages arose when he read Tolkien's works as a boy. As an undergraduate at Macalester College he studied Latin, Greek, and linguistics, and used the knowledge gained to improve his understanding of Tolkien's languages. In 1998 he was among the founders of the Elfling mailing list for Tolkienist language enthusiasts. In 2004 he published a linguistic analysis of Sindarin: A Gateway to Sindarin: A Grammar of an Elvish language from J.R.R. Tolkien's Lord of the Rings. This book was reviewed in 2006 in volume 3 of the journal Tolkien Studies, and it was further reviewed in the context of Tolkienian linguistics as a whole in volume 4 of Tolkien Studies (2007).

Film language consultant 

Salo was contracted for The Lord of the Rings film trilogy to write all the material in Elvish, Dwarvish, and other languages for the films, as well as to assist with other language-related items such as the Tengwar and Cirth inscriptions which appear in the films. Salo also translated the lyrics for the films' soundtracks: many of these are sung in Sindarin in Howard Shore's long and innovative music score for the film series. Subsequently, Salo provided similar services as the Tolkien language consultant for The Hobbit film series.

References

External links

 Interview with David Salo
 Salo's former Midgardsmal language blog

1969 births
Linguists from the United States
Constructed language creators
Living people
University of Wisconsin–Madison alumni
Tolkien linguistic studies
Tolkien studies